The women's 50 metre freestyle competition of the swimming events at the 1987 Pan American Games took place on 15 August at the Indiana University Natatorium. It was the first appearance of this event in the Pan American Games.

This race consisted of one length of the pool in freestyle.

Results
All times are in minutes and seconds.

Heats

Final 
The final was held on August 15.

References

Swimming at the 1987 Pan American Games
Pan